Shanghai New Hongqiao High School ( "Shanghai Private New Hongqiao High School") is a private secondary school in Changning District, Shanghai, serving grades 6 through 12. The school has two departments: Chinese and International. The International Department hosts programs from Noble Hills Academy (NHA) and Vancouver Public Education Alliance (VPEA), accredited in the United States of America and Canada, respectively.

References

External links
 Shanghai New Hongqiao High School 

Schools in Shanghai
Changning District